Nazir Rachidovitch Abdullaev (born 14 June 1991) is a Russian Greco-Roman wrestler. He won the silver medal in the men's 67 kg event at both the 2021 World Wrestling Championships held in Oslo, Norway and the  2020 European Wrestling Championships held in Rome, Italy.

Career 

In 2020, he won the silver medal in the 67 kg event at the European Wrestling Championships held in Rome, Italy. In the final, he lost against Morten Thoresen of Norway.

In the same year, he won the gold medal in the 67 kg event at the Individual Wrestling World Cup held in Belgrade, Serbia. In 2021, he won one of the bronze medals in the 67 kg event at the Matteo Pellicone Ranking Series 2021 held in Rome, Italy.

Major results

References

External links 
 

Living people
1991 births
Sportspeople from Krasnodar
Russian male sport wrestlers
European Wrestling Championships medalists
World Wrestling Championships medalists
21st-century Russian people